There are a number of biofuels used in New Zealand.

Biofuels

Biodiesel

Ecodiesel, a company owned by a group of New Zealand farmers, plans to build a biodiesel plant by the end of 2008. The plant will be built in stages and cheaper than Argent's, and could produce 20 million litres of tallow-based biodiesel per year by April 2009.

In the effort to develop an aviation biofuel, Air New Zealand and Boeing are researching the jatropha plant to see if it can provide a renewable alternative to conventional fuel.

Bioethanol

Gull Force 10, a bioethanol blend, was introduced commercially in New Zealand for the first time by the company Gull on 1 August 2007. It contained 10% ethanol made from dairy by product by Anchor Ethanol, a subsidiary of Fonterra Ltd.  On 8 August 2008, Gull introduced a 91-octane bioethanol blend in Albany. The blend, 'regular plus', contained 10% ethanol and included bioethanol made from whey. Gull planned to release the fuel to 33 stations, and marketed it as under $2 per litre. On release, the company said it would try to keep the price two cents less than its standard 91-octane fuel.

It was reported that British fuel producer Argent Energy would abandon plans to build a plant in Tauranga to produce tallow-based biodiesel. The plant would have cost over $100 million to build, and would have competed with cheaper sugar-based ethanol imports from Brazil. The plant could not proceed because a 42c/L tax break on bioethanol until 2010 had not been approved by the government.

Biomass
Firewood is used as a means of heating some homes in New Zealand and wood pellet fires are now becoming more common, especially in areas with high levels of air pollution.

Legislation and government funding

Biofuel Bill
The Labour-led government introduced a Biofuel Bill in October 2007. It passed its second reading in Parliament in September 2008. The Bill requires petrol and diesel to have a percentage of biofuels added with the amount increasing to 2.5% after five years.

In April 2008 the Parliamentary Commissioner for the Environment, independent from but funded by the government, recommended in a select committee briefing that the Biofuels Bill should not proceed. This conclusion was arrived at on a number of grounds. The Biofuels Bill did not restrict the importation of biofuels and this would lead to potential societal and environmental harm that may be greater than if biofuels were not used. It was also claimed that this may damage the "clean green" image of New Zealand. Waiting for second generation biofuels and curbing the growth in transport energy consumption were also seen as reasons for not supporting the Bill

After the National Party gained power it repealed parts of the Biofuel Bill with the Energy (Fuels, Levies, and References) Biofuel Obligation Repeal Act. It removed the mandatory requirement for all fuel to have a percentage of biofuel.

Sustainable Biofuels Bill
The Green Party tabled a Sustainable Biofuels Bill which passed its first reading in Parliament in July 2009. The Bill "is to ensure that biofuels that are supplied or sold in New Zealand from 1 May 2010 are sustainable biofuels".

Funding
In the 2009 Budget $36 million was made available over a three-year period as grants for biofuel production. It is only available for producers who sell on the local market and are able to meet the quality specifications for engine fuels.

See also

 Biofuels by region
 Solar power in New Zealand
 Wind power in New Zealand
 Ocean power in New Zealand
 Geothermal power in New Zealand
 Hydroelectric power in New Zealand
 Solar hot water in New Zealand
 Renewable energy in New Zealand
 Renewable energy by country

References

External links
Energy Efficiency and Conservation Authority - biofuels page
Bioenergy Association of New Zealand
Text of the Biofuel Bill